Adam Lewis Jackson (born 18 May 1994) is an English professional footballer who plays as a defender for League One club Lincoln City.

Career
Jackson began his career with Middlesbrough and joined Coventry City on loan in September 2015. Jackson failed to make an appearance for the Sky Blues and moved on loan to Hartlepool United in November 2015. He made his Football League debut on 15 November 2015 in a 3 1 win over Leyton Orient.

On 30 August 2016, Jackson signed a 3 year contract with Championship club Barnsley. His first goal for the club came in an EFL Cup tie against Derby County on 12 September 2017.

He was released by Barnsley at the end of the 2018/19 season.

On 30 May 2019, Jackson signed a 2 year deal with Hibernian.

On 11 August 2020, Jackson signed for Lincoln City. He would make his Lincoln debut, starting in the 1 1 draw against Scunthorpe United in the EFL Trophy. He scored his first goal for the club 4 days later on the opening day of the League One season against Oxford United. He would receive a red card in his fifth league game at home to Bristol Rovers.

Career statistics

Notes

References

External links

England profile at The Football Association website (via archive.org)

1994 births
Living people
Footballers from Darlington
English footballers
England youth international footballers
Association football defenders
Middlesbrough F.C. players
FC Halifax Town players
Coventry City F.C. players
Hartlepool United F.C. players
Barnsley F.C. players
National League (English football) players
English Football League players
Hibernian F.C. players
Scottish Professional Football League players
Lincoln City F.C. players